Christine Sponring (born 22 June 1983 in Schwaz) is an Austrian former alpine skier who competed in the 2002 Winter Olympics.

External links
 sports-reference.com

1983 births
Living people
Austrian female alpine skiers
Olympic alpine skiers of Austria
Alpine skiers at the 2002 Winter Olympics
People from Schwaz
Sportspeople from Tyrol (state)